Scarlett Sigourney Leigh Moffatt (born 17 October 1990) is a British television personality, presenter, and former ballroom dancer from County Durham, best known for appearing in the Channel 4 programme Gogglebox. She won the sixteenth series of I'm a Celebrity...Get Me Out of Here! in 2016, and has since appeared in a number of programmes, including the I'm a Celebrity companion show Extra Camp as a co-presenter, and Ant & Dec's Saturday Night Takeaway. 

Most recently she has appeared in a Channel 4 documentary The British Tribe Next Door, alongside her family in a four part series living within a remote Namibian village.

Career 
On 23 September 2013, it was confirmed that Moffatt would be appearing in MTV's new series Beauty School Cop Outs, which follows British and Irish youngsters as they move to a beauty school in Manchester to learn the tricks of the trade.

In 2014, Moffatt became a regular cast member on the Channel 4 reality TV show Gogglebox alongside her parents Mark and Betty, making their debut in the third series in March 2014. Scarlett's younger sister Ava-Grace joined the family on the sofa during the seventh series;  her then boyfriend Luke Crodden first appeared in the eighth series. Her relationship with Luke ended in March 2017. Moffatt has not appeared in Gogglebox since her appearance in I'm a Celebrity...Get Me Out of Here!

On 30 November 2015 she joined the presenting team for Capital Breakfast on Capital North East. 

On 8 November 2016, it was confirmed that Moffatt would be participating in the sixteenth series of I'm a Celebrity...Get Me Out of Here!

After winning I'm a Celebrity...Get Me Out of Here! she began appearing as a panellist on Virtually Famous in December 2016. On 8 January 2017, it was announced that Channel 4 would be reviving dating show Streetmate with Moffatt as the presenter. "I can't believe Channel 4 have asked me to present this iconic show. I remember watching Davina McCall on Streetmate when I was younger and thinking, 'Females can present entertainment shows too. I want to do that when I'm older. It's such a fun show and it's two of my favourite things to do, chat to randomers and a love story." In January 2017, she was the backstage presenter for the National Television Awards.

On 9 January 2017, it was announced that Moffatt would be joining Ant & Dec on Ant & Dec's Saturday Night Takeaway. "I've watched Saturday Night Takeaway with my family for as long as I can remember, I'm such a huge fan, so to be part of one of the biggest entertainment shows out there, with two of my all-time TV heroes Ant and Dec, is an absolute dream." Moffatt said in a statement. On 19 November 2019 she was dropped from her role as co-presenter.

On 2 April 2018, Moffatt guest-hosted an evening radio show on Heart, as part of Heart's Feel Good Easter Weekend.

Since May 2020, Scarlett has presented a BBC Radio 1 podcast with her boyfriend Scott Dobinson, 'Scarlett Moffatt Wants to Believe'.

In 2022, Scarlett appeared alongside six other celebrities including Monty Panesar and Nick Hewer in the BBC television show Pilgrimage. In it, Scarlett and her fellow celebrities walked the route taken by Saint Columba from North Western Ireland to the Island of Iona in Scotland as he brought the Christian faith onto the UK mainland in the late 6th century AD. During the programme, Scarlett spoke of her Christian faith and how it helps her in her life.

Personal life
Moffatt is named after the heroine Scarlett O'Hara, played by Vivien Leigh in Gone with the Wind (1939), her mother's favourite film, and her middle name is after Sigourney Weaver, who played Ellen Ripley in Alien (1979), her father's favourite film. Before finding fame, Moffatt worked as a checkout operator for Asda in her home town of Bishop Auckland. She is also an ex-ballroom and Latin dancer, and has danced in local, regional and national competitions. She studied sport at York St John University. 

Moffatt has revealed she has failed her driving test a total of thirteen times.

In 2022 Mofatt revealed she had become a Christian after participating in the BBC's Pilgrimage series.
In 2023 Moffatt announced that she is pregnant with her first child.

Filmography

Guest appearances
 Big Brother's Bit on the Side (20 August 2014)
 Virtually Famous (1 March 2016)
 Celebrity First Dates (15 July 2016)
 Play to the Whistle (4 April 2017)
 The Crystal Maze (30 June 2017)
 Celebrity Juice (23 March 2017)
 Sunday Brunch (20 August 2017)
 Sunday Brunch (6 November 2017)
 Room 101 (12 January 2018)
 Through the Keyhole (10 February 2018)
 Rob Beckett's Playing for Time (30 March 2018)
Just Tattoo of Us (29 May 2018)
 Would I Lie to You? (2 November 2018)
 Richard Osman's House of Games (14–18 October 2019), champions week (2-6 December 2019) and Festive House of Games (Xmas Special)(26-30 December 2022)
Trip Hazard: My Great British Adventure (9 April 2021)

References

External links
 
 Scarlett Moffatt on Biogs.com

1990 births
Living people
Television personalities from County Durham
I'm a Celebrity...Get Me Out of Here! (British TV series) winners
Alumni of York St John University